Port Anderson is a ghost town in Washington County, Mississippi, United States.

History
The area was settled around 1820 on the banks of the Mississippi River by Major John Lewis Martin (a nephew of Meriwether Lewis), and his son-in-law, John Anderson.  Using slave labor, they established a successful plantation there.

Port Anderson is today covered by the Mississippi River, and the nearby shore is uninhabited bottomland.

References

Former populated places in Washington County, Mississippi
Former populated places in Mississippi
Mississippi populated places on the Mississippi River
1820 establishments in the United States